Brynne Mariah Edelsten (née Gordon; born 29 January 1983)  is an American reality television personality.

Personal life
Brynne married Geoffrey Edelsten on 29 November 2009 in Melbourne, Victoria at the Crown Casino.

Brynne Edelsten subsequently appeared in Series 11 of Dancing with the Stars. She was eliminated on 12 June 2011. In mid-2012, Channel 7 confirmed that Edelsten would be getting her own reality TV show called Brynne: My Bedazzled Life. The first series premiered on 4 October 2012. In 2013, she was featured in Celebrity Splash a show that follows celebrities as they try to master the art of diving.

In January 2014, it was announced that the Edelstens' marriage was over. Brynne said she was unable to forgive "her publicity-obsessed husband for a reported dalliance with another woman more than 18 months ago" as the reason for the break up.

Edelsten's reality TV show returned for a second series on 4 August 2014 with the new title of Brynne: My Bedazzled Diary.

In May 2021, Edelsten was arrested and charged with trafficking drugs and suspected proceeds of crime.

Filmography

Television series

References

External links 

 
 

Living people
1983 births
American socialites
American expatriates in Australia
American exercise instructors
People from Shawnee, Oklahoma
21st-century American women